Love Us or Hate Us is the fourth album released by rap group, Dirty. It was released on September 30, 2003 through Rap-a-Lot Records and featured production from Dirty, MaxiMillion, Mike Jackson, Grade A Muzik. Recorded and mixed by Grade A Muzik and Mike Jackson in Montgomery, Alabama.  Mastered by Mike Dean. The album peaked at #160 on the Billboard 200 and #22 on the Top R&B/Hip-Hop Albums and was the duo's first album to be distributed by Rap-a-Lot Records.

Track listing
"Love Us or Hate Us"- 5:09  
"We Still"- 4:02  
"24 Inches"- 4:25  
"Pimp Life"- 4:10  
"Keep My Name Out Your Mouth"- 4:20  
"Da Hood"- 4:09  
"Gangsta Wife"- 5:23  
"I Wish"- 4:56  
"2 Deep Creepin"- 4:57  
"Ain't No Sunshine"- 4:58  
"If I Die Tonight"- 6:06  
"That's Why I"- 4:10  
"No More Tears"- 6:24  
"Paid My Dues"- 4:39  
"Thou Shall Not Kill"- 4:50

2003 albums
Dirty (group) albums
Rap-A-Lot Records albums